Vladyslav Mykolaiovych Yama, also known as Vlad Yama (born July 10, 1982 in Zaporizhzhia), is a Ukrainian dancer, educator, and is one of three judges for Ukraine's Got Talent and Tantsi z zirkamy.

He has one older brother, Dmitry (born 1975) who works as a lawyer in Odessa. Yama is a graduate of Zaporizhzhia National University, where he earned his degree in physical education.

Career 
Yama started dancing at the age of 7. He first made his debut in a dance group known as "Krok", and shortly moved on to dance in another group called "Fiesta". He also teaches choreography at Kyiv University and dance.

References 
 
 
 

1982 births
People from Zaporizhzhia
Living people
Ukrainian male dancers